Kongur can refer to:

 Kongur, Hınıs, a neighbourhood in Hınıs District, Erzurum Province, Turkey
 Kongur Glacier, Antarctica
 Kongur Tagh, a mountain to the north of the Tibetan Plateau
 Kongur wetland, located in Tirupur District, Tamil Nadu, India
 Kongur-Ölöng,  village in the Issyk-Kul Region of Kyrgyzstan